Mount Fitzwilliam is a  mountain summit located in the Canadian Rockies within Mount Robson Provincial Park in British Columbia, Canada. Its nearest higher peak is Roche Noire,  to the east. Mt. Fitzwilliam is a prominent landmark seen from eastbound Highway 16 before travelers enter Jasper National Park from the west entrance. The mountain is also visible to riders on the Canadian train.

History 
The mountain was named on July 8, 1863 by Walter Cheadle after Viscount Milton (1839–1877) whose father was William Wentworth-Fitzwilliam, 6th Earl Fitzwilliam.  Milton and his personal physician Dr. Walter Cheadle were traveling together up the Athabasca River and may be the first "tourists" to travel through Yellowhead Pass. They later co-authored "The North-West Passage by Land" and " Voyage de l'Atlantique au Pacifique, à travers le Canada", which described their expedition in considerable detail.

The mountain's name was officially adopted February 7, 1951, by the Geographical Names Board of Canada. It was labelled on Arthur O. Wheeler's 1911 topographic map of Mount Robson.

The first ascent of the mountain was made in 1917 by the Interprovincial Boundary Commission.

Climate

Based on the Köppen climate classification, Mount Fitzwilliam is located in a subarctic climate zone with cold, snowy winters, and mild summers. Temperatures can drop below −20 °C with wind chill factors below −30 °C. The months July through September offer the most favorable weather for viewing and climbing this mountain. Precipitation runoff from the mountain drains into tributaries of the Fraser River.

Geology
The mountain is composed of sedimentary rock laid down during the Precambrian to Jurassic periods and pushed east and over the top of younger rock during the Laramide orogeny.
The lower half of the mountain is composed of dolomite, whereas the upper half is quartzite.

See also
 List of mountains in the Canadian Rockies
 Geography of British Columbia

References

External links

 Weather forecast: Mount Fitzwilliam
Mount Robson Provincial Park website—BC Parks
stevensong.com Climbing Mt. Fitzwilliam in photos

Canadian Rockies
Two-thousanders of British Columbia
Cariboo Land District